Little Sinner is a 1935 Our Gang short comedy film directed by Gus Meins. It was the 139th Our Gang short to be released, and the first appearance of two-year old Porky.

Plot
Anxious to go fishing, Spanky skips out of Sunday school, despite the admonitions of his pals Alfalfa, Mildred, Sidney, and Marianne that "Something's going to happen to you." Actually, everything happens to Spanky and his kid brother (Eugene "Porky" Lee) in the course of the morning. Chased out of a private estate by cantankerous caretaker, the two boys wander into a dark, mysterious woods just as an eclipse occurs and at the same time a large group of black worshippers are holding a mass baptism ceremony.  Some view the baptism and background singing of the Negro spiritual "I Am Leaning on The Lord", which contains the words: "Why don't you come out of the wilderness" as a racist stereotype.  However, as Spanky, Porky and Buckwheat are scared out of the woods, a wilderness, it could merely be a play on the song's words for their situation.

Inevitably, the kids scare the worshippers, and vice versa, culminating in a hectic chase.

Note
Little Sinner was withdrawn from the "Little Rascals" TV package in 1971 due to its racial content. It was reinstated in 1979 with severely edited prints that exclude the eclipse and the baptism. Professor Lisa Yaszek said of the racist depiction, "Apparently somehow these black Americans don't know what an eclipse is, so they have that very stereotypical reaction of confusion and fear, which causes chaos for the boys... the way it plays out is so stereotypical and really horrible." The original version was reinstated for the 2001 to 2003 showings on AMC and the 2016 showings on MeTV.
This episode marks the first appearance of Eugene Gordon Lee as Porky.

Cast

The Gang
 Eugene Lee as Porky
 George McFarland as Spanky
 Billie Thomas as Buckwheat
 Carl Switzer as Alfalfa
 Jerry Tucker as Jerry
 Rex Downing as Our Gang member
 Sidney Kibrick as Our Gang member
 Donald Proffitt as Our Gang member
 Jackie Banning as Mary Ann (unconfirmed)

Additional cast
 Ray Turner as Man at Baptism/Man losing tent
 Clarence Wilson - Property owner
 Barbara Goodrich as Church extra
 Joan Lott as Church extra
 Philip Marley Rock as Church extra
 John Collum as Undetermined role
 Mildred Kornman as Undetermined role
 Dickie De Nuet as Undetermined role
 The Etude Chorus as Singers at Baptism

See also
 Our Gang filmography
 List of films featuring eclipses

References

External links

1935 films
1935 comedy films
American black-and-white films
Films directed by Gus Meins
Hal Roach Studios short films
Our Gang films
1935 short films
1930s American films